Eubacterium is a genus of Gram-positive bacteria in the family Eubacteriaceae. These bacteria are characterised by a rigid cell wall. They may either be motile or nonmotile. If motile, they have a flagellum. A typical flagellum consists of a basal body, filament, and hook. The long filament is the organ which helps eubacteria move.

Gram-positive bacteria have a thick proteoglycan layer and take up violet Gram stain (whereas Gram-negative bacteria have a thinner proteoglycan layer which is surrounded by a layer of immune response-inducing lipopolysaccharide, and do not take up Gram stain).

References

Eubacteriaceae
Bacterial vaginosis
Bacteria genera